The 2013–14 season was Arsenal Football Club's 22nd season in the Premier League and 95th consecutive season in the top flight of English football. Arsenal participated in the Premier League, FA Cup, League Cup and the UEFA Champions League, after finishing fourth in the previous Premier League season. Despite an opening day 1–3 league defeat at home to Aston Villa, which exacerbated underlying anger at the club's inactivity in the transfer market, Arsenal's league campaign got off to a strong start. Early pace-setters in the title race, Arsenal led the table for much of the season, spending more time on top of the league than any other side. However, a combination of injuries to key players and heavy defeats away from home against other title challengers saw the Gunners' title ambitions evaporate by late March. Nonetheless, Arsenal achieved success in the FA Cup with a dramatic 3–2 win over Hull City in the 2014 Final, ending a nine-year trophy drought.

Review

Background
In November 2012, Arsenal extended their shirt sponsorship deal with Emirates Airline until 2019 with the Emirates Stadium's naming rights contract also being extended until 2028. It was later announced in January 2013 that Arsenal's home ticket prices would be frozen at the 2012–13 prices for the 2013–14 season. This came after criticism of prices from Arsenal supporters as well as visiting fans, as Arsenal's prices were revealed as one of the highest in world football. However, Arsenal's kit manufacturer was still in doubt as Nike's sponsorship deal ended at the end of the season. In May 2013, it was reported that Puma had signed a five-year deal for an estimated £170 million over the period, a deal that would become the most lucrative kit manufacturer partnership in English football. It will also end a 20-year spell with American sportswear designer Nike. Arsenal had announced the partnership with Puma will be effective from 1 July 2014.

Aside from football on the pitch, Arsenal announced that club legend Freddie Ljungberg would be "renewing his ties with the club" by taking an ambassadorial role with the view of increasing the international awareness for the club. Ljungberg, who was famously a part of the "Invincibles" team, said that he was "honoured to take on this ambassadorial role." In addition, Sir Chips Keswick was appointed as the new club chairman following the 31-year-incumbency of Peter Hill-Wood as chairman, as Hill-Wood resigned following a heart attack the previous year. Though it ended a Hill-Wood association with Arsenal since 1927 (as his grandfather and father were also chairmen of Arsenal Football Club), he stated that he knows "Sir Chips is the right person to take the Club forward."

Pre-season
Arsenal announced plans to play a pre-season friendly in Indonesia's capital Jakarta against the Indonesia national team on 1 November 2012, with the match being played on 14 July 2013. This was to be part of Arsenal's third consecutive Asian tour, in anticipation of the growing fan base in the continent. Arsenal's match in Indonesia was the first time the club played in the country since 1982. Arsenal also announced plans to play in Vietnam's capital Hanoi, in a match that would see the first Premier League team to play a friendly there. In addition, in March 2013, it was announced that Arsenal would play Arsène Wenger's former club, Nagoya Grampus in Japan on 22 July, as well as another Japanese game against Urawa Red Diamonds, extending the Asia tour to four games.

Arsenal also hosted the Emirates Cup in the Emirates Stadium for the first time since 2011, after the 2012 edition was cancelled due to the 2012 Summer Olympics causing infrastructure problems in London, which hosted the event. It was confirmed on 15 May 2013 that Turkish Süper Lig side, Galatasaray and Serie A side Napoli were to be Arsenal's opponents, although this did not receive a good reception from Arsenal fans after the 2000 UEFA Cup Final riots where Arsenal and Galatasaray fans clashed in Copenhagen, Denmark before the UEFA Cup Final. The third side was Porto, who played their two games against Arsenal's two opponents. Arsenal's final pre-season friendly was against fellow Premier League side Manchester City in Helsinki seven days before the season is set to begin. This meant a total of seven pre-season games for the Gunners. It was also reported in 2012 that, after Arsenal postponed a planned friendly with Nigeria in August 2012, the Gunners would play Nigeria in Abuja Stadium in 2013, however, this did not materialise.

Arsenal started their pre-season tour with various promotional activities, including a signing session and television appearances, ahead of their friendly against the Indonesia Dream Team. Arsenal led at half-time 1–0 with the first goal of the season coming from Theo Walcott, with bright displays from Aaron Ramsey and Serge Gnabry. However, it was in the second half that the Gunners began firing, as goals from youngsters Akpom, Olsson and Eisfeld and established players Podolski and Giroud (2) meant Arsenal began their pre-season preparations with an emphatic 7–0 win. Continuing the tour, various Arsenal team members visited numerous tourist attractions in Hanoi, whilst which a Vietnamese Arsenal fan, Vũ Xuân Tiến, ran five miles (eight kilometers) alongside the club's touring bus before eventually being called up by Arsenal's players for pictures; he was subsequently dubbed the "Running Man" by Vietnamese and international media. Arsenal's second pre-season game was against Vietnam, where the Gunners again managed to score seven goals, as Giroud's hat-trick brought his pre-season tally to five. The remaining goals came from youngsters Oxlade-Chamberlain, Akpom and Miquel, with Mạnh Dũng scoring the first goal Arsenal conceded in the season. Arsenal then travelled to Japan to play in a two-part tour involving Wenger's old club Nagoya Grampus, where the Gunners ran out 3–1 winners (with goals from Walcott, Giroud (his sixth for the tour) and Miyaichi) and Urawa Red Diamonds, where a late Chuba Akpom goal kept up Arsenal's 100% record in pre-season as a 2–1 win ensured the Gunners won all four of their Asia Tour matches.

Arsenal then began their ventures in the Emirates Cup, where a Galatasary 1–0 win earlier over Porto, and a 2–2 draw for the Gunners against Napoli (with goals for Frenchmen Giroud and Koscielny for Arsenal), meant Arsenal ended Day 1 second in the table, one point behind their next opponents Galatasary. Arsenal were on course to win the Emirates Cup for a fourth time whilst they led 1–0 against Galatasaray, however old foe Didier Drogba scored two late goals as a 2–1 defeat for the Gunners left them in last place in the table. Arsenal did however, end their pre-season in encouraging fashion, as an goals of exquisite quality from Walcott, Ramsey and Giroud (his 8th in pre-season) capped a brilliant 3–1 victory over Premier League rivals Manchester City in Helsinki. Arsenal finished their pre-season preparations with 25 goals scored and 8 goals conceded spread over eight games and 11 different goals scorers

Transfers
On 30 May 2013, Arsenal announced they were to release 10 reserve team players, three of whom made first-team appearances for the Gunners (Conor Henderson, Jernade Meade and Sanchez Watt), along with seven other players (Bihmoutine, Reice Charles-Cook, Sead Hajrović, Neita, Philip Roberts, Rees and James Shea) who were then free to play for other teams. Manager Arsène Wenger had also revealed Arsenal were not going to renew the contracts of players Andrey Arshavin (who later rejoined his former club Zenit Saint Petersburg) and Sébastien Squillaci, whilst Denílson's agent also confirmed his contract was cancelled by mutual consent (and later signed on a permanent contract by São Paulo), as all three players were free to play for other clubs.

The transfer window opened on 1 July which prompted Arsenal to announce the signing of French Under 20 striker Yaya Sanogo on a free transfer following his contract completion at old club Auxerre. He became the first signing of the season and joined on a "long-term contract". Sanogo was given the number 22 shirt while Abou Diaby switched from the number 2 to the number 24. Arsenal also confirmed that Johan Djourou had joined Hamburg on a one-year loan deal with a view to a permanent deal in the following summer. whilst it was also announced Francis Coquelin has agreed to join Freiburg also for an entire season. Arsenal announced the departure of goalkeeper Vito Mannone to Sunderland for an undisclosed fee, thought to be around £2million, on a two-year contract. Mannone was used as a regular in the absence of Wojciech Szczęsny and Łukasz Fabiański last season. The Gunners also renewed the contracts of four players, three of whom were academy players (Fagan, Anthony Jeffrey and Ansah and the other being the right back reserve-team player Héctor Bellerín. The departures of three players were announced soon afterwards, as Jernade Meade joined fellow Premier League side Swansea City, Sébastien Squillaci completed his transfer to Bastia and left-back André Santos completed his free transfer move to Flamengo on a two-year contract. After the Asia tour had been completed, Arsenal also announced the loan departure of Joel Campbell to Greek side Olympiacos for a third successive loan spell to gain first-team experience. Arsenal continued their summer exodus after announcing the departure of Gervinho to Roma in a deal thought be to around £8 million and the loan departure of Ignasi Miquel to Championship side Leicester City for the remainder of the season.

August
Arsenal kicked off their season in search of their first trophy in 8 years, though the signs were not encouraging as Arsenal began their league campaign with a disappointing 3–1 loss at home to Aston Villa. An early Giroud goal was expected to give the Gunners momentum but a penalty-rebound and a penalty (awarded in controversial circumstances) scored by Benteke and a late counter-attacking goal against the 10 men of Arsenal (following Koscielny's double yellow card) sealed the victory for the visitors. The disappointment was compounded due to Villa's league standing in the previous season (15th) and the lack of signings despite the fans being promised of a summer of increased spending, which ultimately led to manager Arsène Wenger apologising for the display at the Emirates. However, Arsenal fought back confidently with a 3–0 away win at Fenerbahçe as goals from Kieran Gibbs, the much-improved Aaron Ramsey and Olivier Giroud almost secured the Gunners' place in the group stages of the Champions League. Arsenal then travelled to Fulham and picked up a 3–1 victory, thanks to Giroud's third goal in three games and a goal either side of half time from Lukas Podolski. Arsenal continued their impressive run in the second leg of their play-off against Fenerbahçe with a solid 2–0 win to complete a 5–0 aggregate result with two Ramsey goals.

Four games into the season Arsenal announced the re-signing of French midfielder Mathieu Flamini on a free transfer following his release from Italian giants A.C. Milan. Flamini joined the Gunners 5 years after his first spell with Wenger complimenting Flamini's focus when on the football pitch. Arsene Wenger then reiterated his desire to bring in more players ahead of a crucial North London derby.

September

The first North London Derby of the season on 1 September was won by the Gunners through a single Giroud goal in the 23rd minute as they managed to end Tottenham's unbeaten streak and take the Gunners up to fourth in the table. The goal brought Giroud's tally to 4 goals for the season with four consecutive wins in all competitions. In an unusually late 'Transfer Deadline Day', Arsène Wenger's promises in the aftermath of Flamini's signing were seemingly coming true, with two players being linked with Arsenal, one of which was the highly regarded Mesut Özil for a reported £42.4 million. Upon the completion of the deal, Arsenal broke their transfer record fee by £27 million. Another signing was confirmed hours beforehand, as Arsenal completed the loan signing of Emiliano Viviano from Serie B side Palermo for a season-long loan. He has been signed as a back-up keeper to current no.1 Szczęsny. However Özil remained at the fore front of Arsenal activity, as the transfer fee was the second highest in British history and one of the largest fees paid in world football, signalling the intent of the Arsenal Board to propel the club to supposed 'title contenders'. Özil made an impressive début against Sunderland after making numerous opportunities for Walcott and a decisive assist for Giroud that sent the Gunners top of the table temporarily. Arsenal then faced a tricky away tie against Marseille but a solid performance and continued prosperity for Aaron Ramsey put Arsenal top of their Champions League group after Matchday 1. Ramsey's 7th goal in 8 games along with goals from defenders Sagna and Mertesacker sent Arsenal top of the table for the second game in succession (albeit temporarily after the previous game). Özil provided all three assists on his home début as Arsenal ran out 3–1 winners. Arsenal's fortunes away from home continued as they went through to the Fourth Round of the League Cup on penalties against a stubborn West Bromwich Albion. Thomas Eisfeld scored the only goal in regulation time and Nacho Monreal hit the winning penalty to send Arsenal to a Fourth Round tie against Chelsea at the Emirates. Arsenal then won where their Premier League away run began with a 2–1 over Swansea City at Liberty Stadium. German youngster Serge Gnabry (Arsenal's second youngest Premier League scorer behind Fàbregas) and Aaron Ramsey scored the goals as all four sides in the top four last season (excluding Arsenal) dropped points. This left Arsenal leading the table by 2 points by the end of September, over Liverpool and North London rivals Tottenham.

October
Arsenal then overcame a potentially difficult tie against Serie A side Napoli in style with a maiden goal for Özil and a goal from Frenchman Giroud all in the first 15 minutes sealed an impressive 2–0 victory. The win ensured Arsenal a tenth successive win in all competitions. However their winning and away-winning run came to an abrupt end after a 1–1 draw against West Brom. Wilshere's goal in the second half cancelled out Yacob's opener as Arsenal stayed top of the Premier League for the third successive week. Following Liverpool's early kick-off draw at Newcastle, Arsenal needed a win against Norwich City to regain top spot. With goals from Wilshere (first consecutive goals in his career), Özil (2) and the in form Aaron Ramsey, Arsenal won 4–1 and convincingly returned to the Premier League summit. Next Arsenal would host Borussia Dortmund in the Champion's League. A spirited performance ultimately ended in defeat after goals from Mkhitaryan and Lewandowski (who was controversially awarded a yellow card for an offence that has been awarded red cards in the past) cancelled out Giroud's goal leaving the top three teams in the Champions League table on 6 points each. Arsenal returned to Premier League action against a recently manager-less Crystal Palace and a solid 2–0 win (despite going to down to ten men following Arteta's sending off) sent Arsenal temporarily 5 points clear at the top of the table. Ultimately, October ended similarly to September as Arsenal finished 2 points clear at the top of the table at the end of the month. Arsenal now face another tough test against Chelsea in the League Cup as the Gunners look to continue to fight in all four competitions they compete in. Arsenal lost to Chelsea 2–0 at the Emirates Stadium, thus getting eliminated from the League Cup.

November
Despite consecutive home disappointments, Arsenal extended their lead at the top of the table to 5 points after a convincing 2–0 win over Liverpool at the Emirates. Goals from Cazorla and Ramsey secured a win for first place over second place in a top of the table clash. This subsequently gave the confidence for Arsenal to get a historic win with an Aaron Ramsey headed goal (his 11th of the season) giving the Gunners a 1–0 in Dortmund. Arsenal remained top of the Champions League table with 9 points with triple player of the month Ramsey continuing to score. The Gunners then suffered a set-back before the international break as they continued their poor form at Old Trafford to lose 1–0 to Manchester United. Former Gunner Robin van Persie scored with a header against an Arsenal side depleted with illness which narrowed the Gunners' advantage to 2 points at the top of the table. This increased to four in an unlikely top-of-the-table clash against Southampton as a Giroud double either side of the half allowed the Gunners to capitalise on second-placed Liverpool dropping points in their Merseyside derby (3–3). Giroud's 10th of season negotiated a tough period in the Premier League successfully, on the eve of taking on Marseille in the Champions League. In this crucial tie, Arsenal all but secured qualification into the next round (assuming they do not lose 3–0 or more in Naples) with Jack Wilshere's first career double, one after 28 seconds and another in the second half to give Arsenal a 2–0 win. The convincing manner of Arsenal's victory, albeit missing a few opportunities (including a missed penalty from Özil), kept Arsenal top of their group for all 5 matchdays. Arsenal then increased their lead to the top of the table to 7 points temporarily (later reduced back to 4) with a convincing 3–0 win against Cardiff City away. On his return to his former club, Aaron Ramsey scored his 7th and 8th Premier League goals, separated by an unlikely strike from Flamini, which strengthened the Gunners' title credentials.

December
The Gunners continued to stay top of the table (for the 11th consecutive matchday) after a 2–0 victory over Hull City at home. An early header from Nicklas Bendtner (his first since March 2011) and a strike from Mesut Özil ensured the victory ahead of a tough December fixture list for the Gunners. Arsenal then secured a draw against Everton as a late Özil goal was cancelled out by a goal from Gerard Deulofeu, the Barcelona youth on-loan with the Blues. As a result of the results around the Premier League, Arsenal increased their lead to five points at the top of the table ahead of the match against Manchester City. In the last match in the Champions League group stage, Arsenal played away at Napoli. Winning or a draw would assure them of topping their group, but Arsenal lost the game 0–2. They still qualified on head-to-head results, as second placed team (with the top three teams all on 12 points), behind Borussia Dortmund to progress to the knockout stage. Back in the Premier League, Arsenal travelled to the Etihad Stadium to face Manchester City, who had just two goals scored against them at home and no losses. Despite two goals from Theo Walcott (on his first start since September) and a late Mertesacker header, Arsenal lost 6–3, but remained two points ahead of rivals Liverpool. During the match, Laurent Koscielny suffered a laceration to his leg and there were doubts that he would play for at least a month, though this proved not to be the case, and Jack Wilshere was given a two match ban for an abusive hand gesture made during the match. The Gunners then faced another title-chaser in Chelsea nine days later, after being drawn against last years champions Bayern Munich in the round of 16 of the UEFA Champions League. Arsenal drew 0–0 against Chelsea which led to them falling off the top of the league for the first time since 14 September. This meant they entered Christmas second at the table behind Liverpool, who lead as a result of their higher goal difference. Arsenal faced West Ham United away on Boxing Day and following a run of no victories in three matches, Arsenal bounced back with a 3–1 victory, after two goals from Theo Walcott and a single goal from Lukas Podolski. The victory meant Arsenal jumped back on to the top of the table ahead of a trip to St James' Park to play Newcastle. Arsenal finished 2013 with two victories and as league leaders as they ran out 1–0 winners after a scrappy Giroud goal, reflecting the scrappy nature of the match.

January
Arsenal started 2014 with a 2–0 victory against Cardiff at the Emirates Stadium after two late goals from Nicklas Bendtner (88') and Theo Walcott (90+2'). Bendtner injured himself shortly after scoring, leaving the team with a shortage of strikers and a lengthy injury list, with several key players, such as Olivier Giroud, Mesut Özil, Aaron Ramsey and Kieran Gibbs missing the match. In the next match, Arsenal faced rivals Tottenham Hotspur in the third round of the FA Cup. Goals from Santi Cazorla and Tomáš Rosický either side of the half saw Arsenal comfortably win 2–0 at the Emirates Stadium, progressing to the fourth round, where they faced Coventry City. On the injury front, Arsenal lost Theo Walcott for the remainder of the season, after he ruptured the anterior cruciate ligament of his left knee. Back in the Premier League, Arsenal faced Aston Villa, who beat them 3–1 in the first game of the season, looking to maintain their one-point lead from 2013. Goals from Jack Wilshere and then Olivier Giroud inside 59 seconds meant Arsenal were ahead at half-time. Despite a 76th-minute goal from Christian Benteke of Aston Villa, Arsenal held on to their lead to win the game 2–1. The Gunners then extended their winning streak to 5 games in the Premier League as a brace from Cazorla (57th and 62nd minute) ensured Arsenal secured a 2–0 victory over London rivals Fulham before a 10-day hiatus from the competition. Within this period, Arsenal faced Coventry City and comfortably booked their fifth round FA Cup place with a 4–0 rout of the League One side. Goals from Lukas Podolski (two before the interval) and late strikes from substitute Giroud and Cazorla ensured the Gunners secured their 7th win in 7 games in all competitions and a match against Premier League rivals Liverpool in the next round.

Transfers
In a rather quiet window for Arsène Wenger's team, Arsenal signed a solitary midfielder in Kim Källström in a deadline day loan move that will see him remain at the club until the end of the season. Following injuries and suspensions to a number of key Arsenal midfielders, Källström was brought in as experienced cover (at the age of 31) and is eligible for all competitions the Gunners are competing in. The following day, it emerged that Källström had suffered a back injury and would be out for at least the next six matches.

In news concerning the youth players at Arsenal, the club announced the permanent departures of Anthony Jeffrey, Nico Yennaris and Emmanuel Frimpong to Wycombe Wanderers, Brentford and Barnsley respectively, the latter two of whom had made appearances in the first team. It was also announced that youngsters Chuba Akpom and Daniel Boateng had joined Brentford and Hibernian respectively to gain further first team experiences away from the club. Following the 11pm deadline, the loan departure of Park Chu-young was announced by club, with the first-team South Korean striker joining Championship side Watford to gain more playing time away from the club.

February

Arsenal's February started on a sour note after it was revealed their new signing Källström would be out for around the next 6 games of the season despite only signing the day before. However, on the pitch, the month started brightly as a host of their rivals dropped points followed by a convincing 2–0 home win at Crystal Palace ensuring the Gunners remained unbeaten in the last 7 Premier League games going into a tough period of fixtures (described as season-defining by Per Mertesacker). The goals came from a brace from Alex Oxlade-Chamberlain on his first start since the opening day of the season as Arsenal regained their two-point lead from two matches ago. The next match was Liverpool away, which resulted in a humiliating 5–1 defeat at Anfield, with a Mikel Arteta goal from the penalty spot giving the Gunners any consolation from the match. Arsenal then hosted reigning champions Manchester United at the Emirates on the 12th, drawing disappointingly 0–0, with the threat of falling down to third in the Premier League table as Manchester City remain two points behind the Gunners, along with having a game in hand. Shortly afterwards, Wenger claimed that other managers "fear to fail" due to the fact they play down their club's title chances. Mourinho, who himself had played down any chance that Chelsea will win the league, stated that Wenger was a "specialist in failure", as the Arsenal manager had not lifted a trophy since 2005. Wenger later remarked saying that the comments made by Mourinho were 'silly and disrespectful', along with saying that Mourinho had 'embarrassed Chelsea'. Away from the Premier League and off-pitch antics, Arsenal gained their revenge over Liverpool with a 2–1 win in the FA Cup. This win ensured the Gunners progressed into the quarter final, and are scheduled to face another Merseyside club in Everton in that tie on 8 March. Goals from Lukas Podolski and Alex Oxlade-Chamberlain ensured the result, despite Steven Gerrard pulling one back from the penalty spot. The tough run of fixtures now continue for the Gunners with reigning European champions Bayern Munich visiting the Emirates for their last 16 clash in the Champions League. Arsenal had started the game against Munich strong, and were awarded a penalty in the 7th minute with Jérôme Boateng fouling Mesut Özil in the penalty area. Özil failed to convert, as Manuel Neuer saved a left-footed shot in the centre of the goal. Things took a turn for the worse as keeper Wojciech Szczęsny fouled Arjen Robben in the 36th minute, giving away a penalty to the Bavarian side. The foul earned Szczęsny a red card, but Bayern were unable to take the advantage as David Alaba hit the left post. Toni Kroos was able to break the deadlock in the 53rd minute, netting in the top right corner. Towards the latter stages of the game, Thomas Müller was able to put a second past Arsenal, slotting in the bottom right corner. The game had ended 0–2 to Bayern, with Arsenal now requiring 3 goals at the Allianz Arena in order to progress into the quarter finals.

Arsenal had unveiled a statue of former striker Dennis Bergkamp, who had scored 120 goals in 423 appearances, along with being an integral member of the Invincibles team that went an entire league campaign unbeaten. The statue depicts Bergkamp in action for Arsenal against Newcastle in February 2003. The statue will join those of other Arsenal legends in manager Herbert Chapman, striker Thierry Henry and defender Tony Adams, along with the statues being located outside the Emirates Stadium above the Armoury Store.

Arsenal then returned to league fixtures, starting with Sunderland at home, a game Arsenal won 4–1. Olivier Giroud struck early to give the home side the lead, and then slotting again in less than thirty minutes, with Arsenal leading 2–0 at the half-hour mark. Czech playmaker Tomáš Rosický scored three minutes to half time, with a beautiful team goal. The Gunners sealed the game at half time, but were able to score a fourth with defender Laurent Koscielny with a header, following an assist from Santi Cazorla following a corner. Emanuele Giaccherini scored a mere consolation goal for The Black Cats, with a shot into the bottom left corner. There was a scare as Koscielny (who has formed a strong partnership with fellow defender Per Mertesacker) was replaced by Mathieu Flamini due to injury, but manager Wenger said that he would be able to return fit in time for the next league encounter, which is with 14th placed Stoke. Arsenal now sit in 2nd place, behind rivals Chelsea by one point.

March

Arsenal played Stoke which started at a 3pm kick off to begin the new month. Arsenal travelled away for this fixture, and were left disappointed as they lost 1–0. Stoke were awarded a controversial penalty in the 76th minute for a supposed handball from Laurent Koscielny. The penalty was converted by Jonathan Walters, who tucked the ball into the bottom right corner. In his post match press conference, Wenger described Arsenal's finishing as "too selfish" and defeat meant Arsenal boss had won only one of their last four Premier League games.  Arsenal dropped to third, as fellow title contenders Liverpool and Chelsea won their games. Chelsea hwld a four-point gap at the summit of the Premier League, whilst Liverpool moved above Arsenal on goal difference.

Arsenal's second fixture of March was against Everton in the FA Cup at the Emirates. The last time the teams had met, a draw was played, and both teams had also strengthened their squads in the January transfer window. Record signing Özil struck early on, to give the host's the lead. On loan Everton striker Romelu Lukaku tapped in from near the goalline in the 32nd minute to bring the scores back at level pegging. Arsenal were awarded a penalty in the 68th minute following Gareth Barry's challenge on Alex Oxlade-Chamberlain, and the penalty was converted by Mikel Arteta to make Arsenal lead 2–1. Olivier Giroud replaced Yaya Sanogo, along with Tomáš Rosický replacing Oxlade-Chamberlain. The substitutes proved to be crucial, as Giroud netted twice in the last ten minutes and Rosický's sublime passing lead to counterattacks to stretch Arsenal's lead, with the game finishing 4–1. Arsenal progressed through to the semi finals of the FA Cup where they were pitted against holders Wigan, and sought an 11th triumph in football's oldest competition, which would end a trophy drought stretching back to 2005.

Arsenal's third fixture of March consisted of a Champions League last 16 second leg clash against holders Bayern Munich at the Allianz Arena. Arsenal were already 2–0 down from the previous clash between the sides earlier in the year, and in order to progress in the competition they required 3 goals to advance into the quarter finals. The deadlock was broken by Bastian Schweinsteiger who slotted past keeper Łukasz Fabiański (who replaced Wojciech Szczęsny for this match due to Szczęsny's suspension) to put Bayern up 1–0 (3–0 on aggregate). Bayern did not keep the lead for long as former Bayern striker Lukas Podolski slotted over Manuel Neuer to level the scores 1–1. Arsenal needed two more goals but were not able to pursue their lead and the game finished 1–1 (3–1 on aggregate) and Arsenal were knocked out of the competition. Record signing Mesut Özil was substituted at half time, and is facing "at least a few weeks out" after suffering a hamstring injury. Arsenal now travel to White Hart Lane to face fifth placed Tottenham Hotspur in the North London Derby.

On 16 March, Arsenal returned to league action and travelled to White Hart Lane to face Tottenham Hotspur in the North London Derby. Arsenal had won the fixture back in 1–0 September, thanks to a strike from Olivier Giroud. Both teams were looking for a win: Arsenal to stay in the title race whilst Spurs needed the win in order close the gap and qualify for the Champions League. Arsenal set the pace early, and all the effort was rewarded as Tomáš Rosický was able to open the scoring after 72 seconds, after being at the heart of a swift break for the visitors. Laurent Koscielny was able to save a Nacer Chadli shot off the line and Arsenal defended well to get the victory at White Hart Lane, a first for Arsenal since November 2007. After the match Arsenal sat behind Chelsea and Liverpool by four points and goal difference respectively, before facing Chelsea at Stamford Bridge on 22 March.

Elsewhere, key Arsenal midfield duo Santi Cazorla and Aaron Ramsey penned new deals with the club, along with teen sensation Gedion Zelalem who also signed a new deal since joining the club in January 2013.

Arsenal went on to face Chelsea at Stamford Bridge on 22 March 2014, a match that saw manager Arsène Wenger reach 1000 games. The match ended with a 6–0 loss as Samuel Eto'o and André Schürrle opened the scoring twice in the first seven minutes. A handball from Oxlade-Chamberlain resulted in a Chelsea penalty, which was converted by Eden Hazard to make it 3–0 inside the first twenty minutes. Although Oxlade-Chamberlain committed the offence to award the penalty, defender Gibbs was shown the red card much to the confusion of his Arsenal teammates. Oxlade-Chamberlain even said admitted to the offence, but Gibbs was sent off anyway. This was the second time Arsenal conceded three goals in the first twenty minutes of a game during the course of the season. Oscar was able to add a fourth before half time and he added another goal in the 66th minute before new Chelsea signing Mohamed Salah scored his first Chelsea goal to end the match 6–0. Arsenal are now sitting in fourth place, seven points behind leaders Chelsea, and face Swansea on 25 March 2014, looking for a win to keep their title hopes alive.

Arsenal played host to Swansea at the Emirates on 26 March 2014. Arsenal started the match conceding a goal after a Wilfried Bony header. After the first half, Wenger replaced Oxlade-Chamberlain with Lukas Podolski, and Podolski found the back of the net in the 73rd minute, levelling the scores. Olivier Giroud was able to score Arsenals second goal of the night in under 70 seconds after the levelling goal from Podolski, giving Arsenal the lead. It looked like Arsenal were going to secure a win three points when Swansea player Leon Britton surged into the box and shot. The shot was saved by Szczęsny, only for it to ricochet in off Flamini and into the net, ending the game 2–2, giving Wenger's side one point.

Arsenal hosted Manchester City on 29 March with the late kick off. After league leaders Chelsea lost to Crystal Palace earlier the same day, a win for Arsenal would help them gain points on the teams ahead in the table. However, City playmaker David Silva opened the scoring for the Manchester side after he tapped the ball into an empty net after Edin Džeko's shot had hit the post. The Gunners levelled as Mathieu Flamini turned in Lukas Podolski's pass to level the scores at 1–1. No side could get a winner, and the game ended 1–1. The point meant Arsenal still have a slim chance to win the Premier League, sitting in fourth place, five points behind second placed Chelsea, four points adrift of Liverpool (who can top the league if they beat North London rivals Tottenham Hotspur on 30 March) and three points behind Manchester City, who have played two fewer matches than their title rivals. Arsenal can go back in the running for the Premier League should they beat fifth placed Everton at Goodison Park on 6 April.

April
Arsenal began April travelling away at Goodison Park to face Everton. A win would allow Arsenal to close the gap on Everton, who were also challenging for the last Champions League spot, along with gaining points and keeping the pressure on fellow title rivals in Manchester City, Liverpool and Chelsea. Arsenal began the game poorly, and conceded to Steven Naismith in just under 15 minutes. Romelu Lukaku scored his 14th goal of the season when he slotted past after a fine sweeping move made by Everton, before Kevin Mirallas forced Mikel Arteta into his own net, effectively ending the game for Arsenal at 3–0. The defeat means Arsenal have not won a league game since 16 March, along with not winning a single game against the current top-five, along with challenging for the league title a serious doubt. However, on a more positive note, Nacho Monreal and midfielder Aaron Ramsey had both returned from injuries (injuries to the foot and thigh respectively), with the latter featuring in his first match since the 3–1 win at West Ham in December. Arsenal now face Wigan in the FA Cup semi-final at Wembley on 12 April.

Arsenal travelled to Wembley to face Wigan in the FA Cup semi final, a match dubbed as Arsène Wenger's biggest game of the season. Arsenal fielded a side similar to the one that faced Everton, with the exception of Sanogo, Oxlade-Chamberlain, Ramsey and Fabiański who replaced Giroud, Rosický, Flamini and Szczęsny respectively. The first half consisted of no action and Arsenal looked lacklustre through the first half. However, the second half looked more upbeat and Arsenal were creating chances, but midfielder Jordi Gómez opened the scoring from the penalty spot for Wigan after Mertesacker brought down Callum McManaman. The German centre back brought Arsenal back into the game, scoring a header from an Oxlade-Chamberlain cross. Scores were level at 1–1, as Arsenal nor Wigan were able to score during regular time, as extra time preceded. With neither team able to break down the other throughout added time, the winner would have to be decided via penalty kicks. Mikel Arteta opened the scoring for Arsenal, but a Jack Collison penalty for Wigan was saved. On loan midfielder Källström netted in another for Arsenal, before Jean Beausejour was able to net in for the Championship side. Giroud was able to score another, giving Arsenal a healthy 3–1 advantage, before James McArthur scored another for Wigan. With Arsenal having the lead, a successful penalty from Santi Cazorla would propel Arsenal through to the FA Cup final. Cazorla was able to find the net, having slotted into the bottom left corner. Arsenal will now face the winner of the second FA Cup semi final between Sheffield United and Hull City, (a match which Hull won), and Arsenal will now face Hull in the FA Cup final on 17 May, hoping to end a trophy drought stretching back to 2005.

Arsenal now focused on league action, and hosted West Ham at the Emirates. Coming into the game, Arsenal had not won a league fixture since the 6-0 thrashing at Chelsea on 22 March. The team that was selected saw Szczęsny, Vermaelen, loanee midfielder Källström (making his first start for the Gunners) and Giroud return to the starting line-up. Arsenal started the game quite slow, and Giroud missed a clear chance inside 30 minutes, where Arsenal began to pick up the face. However, they were down after 40 minutes, with Matt Jarvis heading home for West Ham. Then, Cazorla picked up the ball following a poor clearance from Stewart Downing, and his pass was expertly finished by Podolski, who levelled the scores with a shot on the turn two minutes later for the impressive FA Cup finalists. Arsenal headed into half time at 1–1, and began the second half with the same pace shown late in the first half. Vermaelen had delivered a long ball back into the box following a corner and with a touch of class from Olivier Giroud, he netted his 20th goal of the season. However, instead of sitting on the lead, Arsenal drove forward for more, and Podolski's fierce drive sealed the win as Arsenal moved up to fourth, and the Gunners will now travel away to Hull City (who are also Arsenal's FA Cup final opponents) for league action on 20 April.

Arsenal travelled away to Hull, searching for three points to keep their Top Four hopes alive. The Gunners welcomed back Aaron Ramsey and Mesut Özil back into the side after lengthy spells on the sidelines due to injury. The match was played in blustery conditions which caused an early hold-up in play as advertising hoardings were blown across the pitch, and against opponents committed to pressing high and hard, this match had the potential to be a tough one for the Gunners. But the match went underway and Arsenal almost went down after Shane Long's shot went high. However, Arsenal took control as Santi Cazorla set up Aaron Ramsey to fire in and Podolski buried a half-volley. Podolski turned in a loose ball after the break and Hull never threatened to peg back their FA Cup final opponents. Arsenal managed to contain Hull throughout the game, and Aaron Ramsey displayed the attacking intelligence missed by the Gunners during his injury, as he had the most touches (104), most shots (four), and the joint-highest number of shots on target (three) of any Arsenal player in the match. Arsenal still remain a point above Everton, (who are also chasing Champions League qualification), after the Merseyside club beat Man Utd at Goodison Park. Arsenal will now host Newcastle at the Emirates on 28 April.

Arsenal hosted Newcastle at the Emirates for their final game of April, knowing a win would put them on the brink of securing Champions League football for a 17th consecutive season. After beginning the match with a low-key start, the Gunners went ahead when Laurent Koscielny prodded home Santi Cazorla's free-kick. Cazorla's ball from deep was floated into a dangerous area over the Magpies' backline and Koscielny shrugged off Moussa Sissoko to meet it on the bounce and poke past Tim Krul. The second goal arrived three minutes before the break when Giroud sprung the Newcastle offside trap to race on to a Mikel Arteta pass. Twice his shots were blocked by Krul, but the loose ball rolled across goal to present Özil — who may have been marginally offside — with a simple finish. Newcastle could have pulled one back, however, as Loïc Rémy, making his first start since 1 March, controlled the ball and flicked it through to Yoan Gouffran, who outpaced Nacho Monreal but could not find a way past Wojciech Szczęsny from a tight angle. Arsenal were not on the back foot for long, and soon the victory was secure after Ramsey played Özil into space on the left and his cross was expertly headed home by Giroud at the near post. Lukas Podolski went close again when his side-footed shot fizzed past the upright before, at the other end, Paul Dummett's effort flew horribly wide to sum up a miserable night for the Magpies. With the win, Arsenal had a four-point gap over Everton in the race for 4th place with two games remaining.

May
On 3 May, Manchester City won against Everton, meaning Arsenal stayed four points ahead of Everton. With Everton having only one match left to play, Arsenal secured a top four spot in the League, meaning that Arsenal ensured that they will qualify for the 2014–15 UEFA Champions League play-off round next season. The Gunners could mathematically still reach third place in Premier League, which would mean qualification into the group stages of the competition.

Arsenal's penultimate game of the season was hosting Premier League strugglers West Brom on 4 May. Arsenal won 1–0, however, despite the scoreline, The Gunners had rarely been threatened by the Baggies, and after 14 minutes, Oliver Giroud netted his 22nd goal of the season. The France striker grabbed the only goal of the game, rising in front of marker Craig Dawson to convert Santi Cazorla's corner. The France international has brilliant knack of losing his marker when the ball is played from the wings, and on this occasion, he beat Dawson to score his 15th Premier League goal. However, Giroud's early opening goal provided one of the few rousing moments during a sedate match. Ben Foster was given little chance with that effort and perhaps should not have been given any with a Cazorla shot moments later. But the England World Cup hopeful was on his toes to push away the Spaniard's effort as it headed for the bottom corner. Arsenal went close once more, after the break, when Lukas Podolski mis-hit a half-volley from 10 yards that bounced off the post and into the arms of Foster. West Brom's best effort in the game came from Graham Dorrans, but his 25-yard shot was patted down by Wojciech Szczęsny. The win sits Arsenal in 4th, on 76 points, behind rivals Chelsea (who sit in 3rd) by 3 points. The Gunners finish their league campaign at Norwich on 11 May before an FA Cup final against Hull on 17 May, as they aim to end a run of nine years without a trophy.

Arsenal, for their final Premier League fixture of the season, travelled away to Norwich, who looked doomed to relegation from the Premier League. The only way the Canaries would have stayed up was if West Brom lost to Stoke and if Norwich won 17–0. Jack Wilshere returned after a foot injury for the final 30 minutes, while knee injury victim Abou Diaby also came on for the Gunners in his first game in 14 months. But it was Ramsey, also returning from injury, who shone for the visitors, rifling in a superb volley from Giroud's delicate chip to the back post. It was the Welshman's 17th goal of an injury-disrupted season, and Arsenal went into the game with a Champions League spot already secured and with the prospect of a first trophy for nine years still to come in next week's FA Cup final, and a strong Gunners side rarely had to rise above second gear at Carrow Road. After Ramsey's opener, Jenkinson grabbed his first Arsenal goal, pouncing on Podolski's deflected shot from a Kieran Gibbs cross. Norwich never wilted, and debutant Jamar Loza stung Fabiański's fingers while the Polish keeper had to be quick off his line to close down Robert Snodgrass. The win confirmed Norwich's relegation, and only strengthened Arsenal's momentum heading into the FA Cup final.

Arsenal's final game of the 2013-14 campaign in all competitions took place at Wembley Stadium against Hull City in the 2014 FA Cup Final. The Gunners started as favourites but were stunned as goals from James Chester and Curtis Davies gave Hull a flying start inside the first eight minutes.  Arsenal needed to find a way back into the match and it came after 17 minutes when Cazorla curled a free-kick beyond the Hull City keeper Allan McGregor, making it 1–2 into half-time. In the second half Arsenal put pressure on Hull City and the equaliser came with 19 minutes left. It was Laurent Koscielny who scored from a corner after a header from Bacary Sagna and a deflection from Olivier Giroud. Arsenal kept the pressure, but no team could find a winning goal and the match went into extra time. After 108 minutes Aaron Ramsey scored what would be the match winning goal with a first-time finish inside the area after a backheel pass from Olivier Giroud. Arsenal, and goalkeeper for the day Lukas Fabianski, managed to stop Hull City form scoring an equaliser and won a trophy for the first time in nine years.

Players

Squad information

Reserve squad

Transfers

Transfers in

Loans in

Total spending:   Undisclosed  (~ £42,500,000)

Transfers out

Loans out

Total income:  Undisclosed  (~ £10,000,000)

Overall transfer activity

Spending

Summer:  Undisclosed  (~ £42,500,000)

Winter:  £0

Total:  Undisclosed  (~ £42,500,000)

Income

Summer:  Undisclosed  (~ £10,000,000)

Winter:  £0

Total:  Undisclosed  (~ £10,000,000)

Net expenditure

Summer:   Undisclosed  (~ £32,500,000)

Winter:  £0

Total:   Undisclosed  (~ £32,500,000)

Club

Coaching staff

Kit
Supplier: Nike / Sponsor: Fly Emirates

Kit information
Nike supplied their last kit for Arsenal this season, which saw an end to 20 years of contract. Puma became the club's new supplier kit for next season.
Home: The home kit from last season was unchanged. As usual, Arsenal switched to red socks in an event of a socks clashes in some away games, and for the first time since against Birmingham City in 1982–83, navy shorts were worn against Fenerbahçe with the home kit.
Away: The away kit used the traditional Arsenal colours of yellow and blue. The design appealed to a lot of fans. The kit was yellow with a blue polo neck collar and deep blue cuffs on the sleeves, both featuring thin yellow stripes. The away shorts were blue while the away socks featured the traditional Arsenal hoops socks design in blue and yellow, harking back to the style of those worn in the 1930s under the management of Herbert Chapman.
Keeper: There were four goalkeeper kits, and all of them were all based on Nike's two-tone goalkeeper template. The home kit was grey and black with lime green accents. The away kit was in two shades of purple, while the third kit was in two tones of light green and was the most commonly worn strip. The fourth and the last kit, which was in two tones of silver, was only used once against Bayern Munich in the first leg.

Kit usage

Other information

Squad statistics

Appearances and goals

[R] - Reserve team player
[L] - Out on loan
[S] - Sold

Top scorers

Last updated: 17 May 2014Source: CompetitionsCompetitive matches only

Disciplinary record

Last updated:17 May 2014Source: CompetitionsCompetitive matches only * indicates a second yellow card

Captains

Pre-season and friendlies

Last updated: 14 April 2014Source:Arsenal F.C.

Competitions

Overall

Premier League

League table

Results summary

Results by matchday

Matches

Last updated: 11 May 2014Source: Arsenal F.C.Note: Premier League fixtures not listed due to copyright

FA Cup

Last updated: 17 May 2014Source: Arsenal F.C.

League Cup

Last updated: 14 April 2014Source: Arsenal F.C.

UEFA Champions League

Play-off round

Group stage

Knockout phase

Round of 16

Last updated: 14 April 2014Source: Arsenal F.C.

Awards

Arsenal Player of the Month award

Awarded monthly to the player that was chosen by fan voting on Arsenal.com

Premier League Manager of the Month award

Awarded monthly to the manager that was chosen by a panel assembled by the Premier League's sponsor

Premier League Player of the Month award

Awarded monthly to the player that was chosen by a panel assembled by the Premier League's sponsor

References

Arsenal
Arsenal
Arsenal F.C. seasons